Khayyam Street is a street located in District 12 of the city of Tehran, Iran. It was named in honour of the poet Omar Khayyam.  

Khayyam Street intersects Imam Khomeini Street at its northern terminus and Shoosh Street at its southern terminus.  

This street was called Jalil Abad Street during the Qajar Dynasty.

See also
Courthouse of Tehran
Park-e Shahr

References 

Streets in Tehran